Pavas is the ninth district of the San José canton, in the San José province of Costa Rica. The district comprises Tobías Bolaños International Airport, San José's domestic airport.

Geography 
Pavas has an area of  km2 (the largest district in the canton)  and an elevation of  metres.

It is adjacent to Escazú Canton to the south, and to Uruca and Mata Redonda districts to the north and east respectively.

Demographics 

For the 2011 census, Pavas had a population of  inhabitants.

Locations
Pavas District includes the "barrios" (or neighbourhoods) of Aeropuerto, Alfa, Bribri, Favorita Norte, Favorita Sur, Geroma, Gerona, Hispana, Libertad, Lomas del Río, Llanos del Sol, María Reina, Metrópolis, Pavas Centro, Residencia del Oeste, Rincón Grande, Rohrmoser, Rotonda, San Pedro, Santa Bárbara, Santa Catalina, Tajo, Triángulo, Villa Esperanza, and Zona Industrial.

Education

International schools include:
 British School of Costa Rica
 Colegio Humboldt (Humboldt-Schule) - German school

Transportation

Road transportation 
The district is covered by the following road routes:
 National Route 39
 National Route 104
 National Route 174

Rail transportation 
The Interurbano Line operated by Incofer goes through this district.

References 

Districts of San José Province
Populated places in San José Province